Belarus participated in the Junior Eurovision Song Contest 2019, held in Gliwice, Poland on 24 November 2019. The Belarusian entry for the 2019 contest was selected through a national final organised by the Belarusian broadcaster National State Television and Radio Company of the Republic of Belarus. It saw ten competing acts participating in a televised production where the winner was determined by a 50/50 combination of votes from a jury made up of music professionals and a public vote. Liza Misnikova represented Belarus with the song "Pepelny (Ashen)".

Background

The country previously hosted the  contest in Minsk and hosted for a second year in 2018, with Daniel Yastremski representing the country with the song "Time". It ended in 11th place with 114 points.

Before Junior Eurovision

National final
The national final took place on 20 September 2019. Liza Misnikova was the winner of the event with the song "Pepelny (Ashen)" and went on to represent the nation at the Junior Eurovision Song Contest 2019.

At Junior Eurovision
During the opening ceremony and the running order draw which both took place on 18 November 2019, Belarus was drawn to perform seventh on 24 November 2019, following Georgia and preceding Malta.

Voting

Detailed voting results

References

Junior Eurovision Song Contest
Belarus
2019